The first Jewish settlers in New Zealand were Anglo-Jewish traders. Small numbers of Anglo-Jewish immigrants followed, some subsidized by a Jewish charity in London which had a mission of caring for the poor and orphaned young people in the community. These "subsidised" Jewish immigrants were also intended by their benefactors to be devout members of the fledgling Jewish community in Wellington, to which the respected English business leader Abraham Hort, Senior, was sent from London to organise along London religious lines. The difficulties of life in early colonial New Zealand, together with historically high rates of intermarriage, made it hard to maintain strict religious observation in any of the new congregations.

Following news of gold rushes, Jewish immigrants poured in from new lands such as Germany, and then moved on when the boom was over. These immigrants, and others from Eastern Europe faced an increasingly stringent immigration policy throughout the end of the 19th and mid 20th century, but Jewish New Zealanders and their descendants have continued to contribute in business, medicine, politics, and other areas of New Zealand life, at the highest levels, and the spectrum of Jewish religious observance continues in communities throughout the country. While New Zealand has experienced several anti-Semitic incidents in recent decades, the government and public response has been swift and unequivocal.

Early immigrants
Anglo-Jewish traders were among the early immigrants from the 1830s onwards.

Joel Samuel Polack, the best known and most influential of them, arrived in New Zealand in 1831. Polack, an English-born Jew, opened a general store at Kororareka in the Bay of Islands, where, following the tradition of centuries of European "Port Jews", his respect for the Māori people's culture earned him unique access and insights as a trader.

John Israel Montefiore, also an English-born Jew, left Sydney, Australia for New Zealand in October 1831. He became a merchant in Tauranga and Kororareka, and later, Auckland, where he featured prominently in civic affairs.

Returning briefly to England in 1837, Polack wrote two popular books about his 1831–37 travels in New Zealand. In addition to being entertaining travel guides to new tastes (hearts of palm, for example), sights and sounds (Māori tattoos, exotic birds), etc., his books were a rallying cry for commercial development, specifically for flax production which he believed was possible on a lucrative scale.

In 1838, in testimony to a House of Lords inquiry into the state of the islands of New Zealand, Polack warned that unorganised European settlement would destroy Māori culture, and advocated planned colonisation. With the signing of the Treaty of Waitangi on 6 February 1840, the way was cleared for colonisation and the first legitimate immigrants. The British government and the speculative New Zealand Company, among whose financial backers was the wealthy Anglo-Jewish Goldsmid family anticipated (wrongly, as it turned out, at least in the next few decades) that land would increase in value, and encouraged a flood of subsidised mostly English and Scottish emigrants.

Abraham Hort, Jr, related by family and business ties to the Mocatta & Goldsmid bank, arrived in Wellington on the barque Oriental on 31 January 1840 accompanied by two brothers he employed as cabinet makers, Solomon and Benjamin Levy. These were the first recognisably Jewish names in this early wave of post-Treaty settlement.

Hort's business and civic leadership was quickly recognised in the new colony. Within months of his arrival he was elected one of the two constables for Wellington's fledgling police force. Hort was a promoter of early Wellington civic affairs, Jewish and non-Jewish.

David Nathan was an important Auckland businessman and benefactor, who is perhaps best known for establishing the firm L.D. Nathan and Company. He left Sydney for the Bay of Islands on the Achilles on 21 February 1840.

Nathaniel William Levin was another early immigrant, who became a notable merchant in Wellington and a politician. He arrived in Wellington on 30 May 1841 on the Arachne.

Economic and religious factors in early Anglo-Jewish emigration

Hort's father, Abraham Hort Senior saw New Zealand as a possible haven for impoverished English Jews and a potential refuge for oppressed Jews of eastern Europe and elsewhere. The Jews' Hospital (Neveh zedak), which was largely funded by the Goldsmid family, sponsored two Jewish women to emigrate in 1841 on the barque Birman: Elizabeth Levy, (sister of the Levy brothers), and Esther Solomon, who was being sent to marry one of the brothers. 

Bills allowing Jews more civil rights in England had been introduced and repeatedly voted down, and Jews in the 19th century continued to be portrayed with racist stereotypes. Among the promises of emigration for Jews was that the lack of manpower would level the ethnic playing field

Early Jewish ceremonies

The first Jewish ceremony in New Zealand was the marriage of businessman David Nathan to Rosetta Aarons, the widow of Captain Michael Aarons, on 31 October 1841. Their daughter, Sarah Nathan, born 10 January 1843, was the first known Jewish birth in New Zealand. The second ceremony, the marriage of Esther Solomon and Benjamin Levy was on 1 June 1842 in Wellington, according to the ketubah contract in Hebrew, witnessed by Alfred Hort (another of Abraham Hort Senior's sons) and another early Jewish emigrant Nathaniel William Levin. Levin, for whom the town of Levin was later named, soon married Hort Senior's daughter, Jessy, further connecting the small group of early Wellington Jews.

In early 1843, Abraham Hort, Sr. arrived in Wellington, where he organised and promoted the Jewish community, with the approval of London's Chief Rabbi. Hort brought with him David Isaacs, also an alumnus of the Jews' Hospital. Isaacs served as Mohel (to perform circumcisions), shochet (kosher butcher) and chazan (Cantor/lay leader for services). The first religious service was performed soon after, on 7 January 1843. A few months later, the new community celebrated the birth of Benjamin's and Esther's first child, Henry Emanuel Levy, which Hort documented in a series of letters sent to The Jewish Chronicle (the premier London Jewish newspaper of the time).

Acting on behalf of the community, Hort requested a plot of land for a synagogue and a plot of land for Jewish burials, offering himself as one of the trustees. The request was originally denied, the government responding that it didn't have the authority.

The death of the Levy's second son, aged 8 months in 1845 was, Hort wrote to the Chronicle, "our first Jewish corpse" and the "first Jewish burial" in the new Jewish cemetery.
Throughout the early 1840s, Hort's letters to the London Jewish Chronicle and the Voice of Jacob reveal the difficulty of maintaining a Jewish community that could barely muster a minyan, owing to the demands of making a living, and complaining how few Jewish shopkeepers respected the sabbath by closing their doors, let alone celebrating Jewish holidays properly.
A Māori massacre, the threat of forced militia service for all, and the extreme difficulty of making a living, took their toll on the small community. Isolation rapidly gave way to intermarriage. Solomon Levy quickly married Jane Harvey, the 14-year-old Christian shipmate of Esther Solomon and Elizabeth Levy. Although only one of his eight surviving children chose Judaism as a religion, Levy helped found the first Wellington synagogue and taught Hebrew to Jewish children for many years.

Mid-1800s gold rushes
In 1849–1850 the California Gold Rush led to an exodus of early New Zealand Jewish settlers, including Joel Samuel Polack, Benjamin Levy, and Abraham Hort. For those who remained, gold rushes in New Zealand in the 1860s, the Central Otago Gold Rush from 1861 and the West Coast Gold Rush from 1864 shifted their businesses from centres like Auckland and Wellington to new towns and (like Sir Julius Vogel) to Dunedin in the South Island. In 1862, the congregation in Dunedin had 43 members. Those drawn to gold strikes in the 1860s and after, were instrumental in founding businesses and helping to erect the many synagogues that were established at this time.

Late 19th century

Restrictions were instituted in 1881 that effectively closed off immigration to immigrants who were not from England, Ireland, or Scotland, who were Asian, or any other culture deemed too foreign (a category which also included eastern European Jews). New Zealand, like Australia, had struggled with its white, Christian identity. Some have attributed this attitude to New Zealand's geographic isolation at the time, to fear of economic competition, to the dilution of a perceived "white" culture.

20th century

As a result of the restrictions put into place earlier, few Jews were granted refuge in New Zealand before, during or after the Holocaust. First called "enemy aliens" because of their German nationality, popular sentiment suggested that they leave as soon as the war was over, as they were competing with New Zealanders for work. The major veterans group, the Returned Services' Association, in 1945 suggested that not only should the "enemy aliens" go back where they came from, but that any money they had made during their stay should be turned over to the wives and children of the soldiers, who had risked their lives while the Jews stayed safely in New Zealand.

Moreover, dozens of Jewish men and women from New Zealand joined British Commonwealth forces during World War II, mainly serving in the RAF.

More recently, Jewish immigrants have come from South Africa, Israel, and the former Soviet Union.

Role in leadership
Three Prime Ministers have Jewish ancestry, although only Julius Vogel, who served twice during the 1870s, practised Judaism. Francis Bell was PM very briefly in 1925. Former Prime Minister John Key was born to an Austrian Jewish mother and is thus considered Jewish under Halakha, though he is not practising.

More recent religious and cultural developments
Moriah School, Wellington's only Jewish day school opened in 1985. It closed in December 2012, citing a lack of resources and fewer than 20 pupils.

In 2010 the practice of shechita, the ritual slaughter of mammals and birds, attracted controversy when the Minister of Agriculture reversed a decision that had banned it. The issue was about to be heard in the High Court but pressure from Jewish community members who wanted to slaughter poultry in the traditional manner promoted the move.

In recent years a small but growing Chabad movement has been established in several cities, including Otago and Auckland. The Chabad house in Christchurch was destroyed in the 2011 earthquake that hit New Zealand. International Jewish fundraising efforts helped the Chabad community to rebuild.

Antisemitic attacks
In 1990, four children at an Auckland Jewish day school were stabbed by an apparently demented woman, but all survived.

In 2004, scores of Jewish graves, including Solomon Levy's and other historic early Jewish graves, were smashed and spray painted with swastikas and other anti-semitic messages at Wellington. The New Zealand Parliament responded rapidly to condemn the actions. Solomon Levy's grave was restored by the City of Wellington and re-consecrated in 2005.
 

In October 2012, a Jewish cemetery in Auckland was desecrated overnight with swastikas and anti-semitic statements scrawled across the grave stones. More than 20 graves were attacked at the Karangahape Road cemetery. The perpetrator, a young Englishman on holiday in New Zealand, was convicted and ordered to leave the country.

Founding of synagogues
Three early synagogues at Nelson, Hokitika, and Timaru are no longer in existence. Hokitika's synagogue, which served the boom and bust Gold Rush Jewish population, was virtually abandoned for the last decades of the 19th century and was known as "the Ghost Synagogue."

The Dunedin Synagogue was established at Dunedin in September 1863 and lay claims to be the southernmost permanent synagogue in the world.

The Canterbury Hebrew Congregation obtained funds in 1863 to build a small wooden synagogue on a block of land in Gloucester Street (between Cambridge Terrace and Montreal Street) in Christchurch. The next synagogue, called Beth El Synagogue, was built on the same site and opened in 1881.

The first synagogue in Wellington was Beth El, established in 1870 at 222 The Terrace. By the 1920s, this wooden building with a capacity of 200 was too small for the city's 1400 participants and a new brick building was built on the same site and opened in 1929. The site was required to be vacated for motorway construction in 1963, and a new Wellington Jewish Community Centre was opened at 74–80 Webb Street in 1977.

In Auckland, a synagogue building was designed in 1884–85 and opened on 9 November 1885. The building still stands at 19A Princes Street, has heritage protection, and is now known as University House. The community moved to larger premises at Greys Avenue in 1967.

Demographics

In 1848, in New Zealand's total population of 16,000 there were known to be at least 61 Jews, 28 in Wellington and 33 in Auckland. The 2013 New Zealand census data gives 6,867 people identifying as having a Jewish religious affiliation, out of the total New Zealand population of 4.5 million. Another estimation (2009) was around 10,000 Jewish people. In 2012 a book titled "Jewish Lives in New Zealand" claimed that there were more than 20,000 Jewish people in New Zealand, including non-practising Jews. There are seven synagogues.

In the 2018 New Zealand Census, 5,274 identified as having a Jewish religion.

See also

 List of Oceanian Jews

References

External links
Jews in New Zealand in Te Ara: Encyclopedia of New Zealand
Jews in New Zealand in 1966 Encyclopaedia of New Zealand
New Zealand Jewish Archives
Wellington Jewish Community
"Jewish Women in New Zealand"
 New Zealand; Being a Narrative of Travels and Adventures during a Residence in that Country between the Years 1831 and 1837 (1838). Full text Vol. I, Vol. II
 Manners and Customs of the New Zealanders (1840). Full text Vol. I, Vol. II